Ngaroto railway station was a station on the North Island Main Trunk in New Zealand,  south of Lake Rd,  north of Te Awamutu, beside the entrance to Yarndley's Bush. Lake Ngaroto is visible from the railway to the north of the station.

The station was planned in 1879 and opened in 1880 at the same time the NIMT was extended to Te Awamutu, though it wasn't mentioned in the press until postal contracts were being let in 1881. By 1884 Ngaroto had a 4th class station, passenger platform, cart approach,  x  goods shed, loading bank, stationmaster's house and urinals. From 1883 to 1917 there was a Post Office at the station. There were cattle yards by 1897 and sheep yards by 1911. A crossing loop could hold 41 wagons. There was a proposal to close the station in 1886. It was staffed until 1887, when a ganger took on running the post office. In the early years it was a vital part of local farm transport.

Ngaroto only featured in annual reports for 3 years –

References

External links
Ngaroto on 1:50,000 map

Defunct railway stations in New Zealand
Railway stations opened in 1880
1880 establishments in New Zealand
Rail transport in Waikato
Buildings and structures in Waikato